Lapitaichthys frickei is a species of viviparous brotula found on reefs around New Caledonia.  This species grows to a length of  SL.  This species is the only known member of its genus. The specific name refers to  the ichthyologist Ronald Fricke of the Staatliches Museum für Naturkunde Stuttgart while the generic name is derived from a mishearing of the local word xaapeta which means "to dig a hole" and the Greek ichthys which means "fish".

References

Bythitidae
Monotypic fish genera
Fish of New Caledonia
Fish described in 2007